Beata Prei (born  in Więcbork) was a Polish weightlifter, competing in the 69 kg category and representing Poland at international competitions. 

She participated at the 2000 Summer Olympics in the 69 kg event. She competed at world championships, most recently at the 1999 World Weightlifting Championships.

Major results

References

External links
 
http://www.olimpijski.pl/pl/bio/1819,prei-beata.html 
http://www.upi.com/Archives/2001/09/01/Goodwill-Games-Results/3557999316800/

1977 births
Living people
Polish female weightlifters
Weightlifters at the 2000 Summer Olympics
Olympic weightlifters of Poland
People from Więcbork
Sportspeople from Kuyavian-Pomeranian Voivodeship